Illinois Township may refer to:

 Illinois Township, Pope County, Arkansas
 Illinois Township, Washington County, Arkansas
 Illinois Township, Sedgwick County, Kansas

See also
 List of Illinois townships